Senaka Angulugaha (4 April 1959 – 2 February 2020) was a Sri Lankan cricketer. He played in thirteen first-class matches for Sri Lanka Air Force Sports Club from 1988/89 to 1989/90. In 2019, he was appointed as the head of Sri Lanka women's cricket. He died in February 2020 from blood poisoning. Following Angulugaha's death, memorial matches were announced in his honour.

References

External links
 

1959 births
2020 deaths
Sri Lankan cricketers
Sri Lanka Air Force Sports Club cricketers
Cricketers from Colombo